Derwenlas is a hamlet in northern Powys, Wales. It is part of the community of Cadfarch.

Part of the historic county of Montgomeryshire (Sir Drefaldwyn) from 1536 to 1974, it lies on the River Dyfi and was once a port serving the market town of Machynlleth. 
Derwenlas lies on the A487 trunk road from Machynlleth to Aberystwyth.

Corris Railway 
The narrow-gauge Corris, Machynlleth & River Dovey Tramroad (opened 1859) carried slate from the quarries around Corris and Aberllefenni to the riverside quays here, including Cei Ellis and Cei Tafarn Isa, where it was loaded into ships for onward shipment.

In 1863, the Aberystwith and Welsh Coast Railway extended the standard-gauge rails west of Machynlleth and, on reaching Derwenlas, built the new line across the bend of the river by filling in the channel and creating a new course for the Dyfi, in the process cutting off Derwenlas' quays from the river channel and killing off the port.

The tramroad was planned to continue to Cei Ward at Morben but this section was probably never built. The entire section west of Machynlleth was abandoned and slate was instead trans-shipped to mainline trains.

References

External links 
Photos of Derwenlas and surrounding area on geograph.org.uk

Villages in Powys
Corris Railway